Bartoloměj Kuru (born 6 April 1987 in Vienna, Austria) is an Austrian footballer who plays as a goalkeeper for Wiener Neustadt.

Club career
Kuru made his FK Austria debut at the age of 16 in 2002–03. He was primarily a reserve to Szabolcs Sáfár since then, although he did spend part of the 2004–05 season on loan to LASK Linz. He also experienced regular competitive action playing for FK Austria's Amateure (reserve) side in the Austrian Football First League.

In summer 2008 his contract with FK Austria was terminated. On 12 January 2009 he signed with SV Grödig and in summer 2009 signed for DAC Dunajská Streda.

International career
In the summer of 2007, aged 20, he was selected to play for Austria at the U-20 World Cup in Canada, reaching the semi-finals with his team.

Personal
Kuru has appeared for the Austrian national youth teams from under-17 to the under-21 team. He is of Czech descent.

References

External links
 Dac Dunajska Profile
 

1987 births
Living people
Austrian people of Czech descent
Austrian footballers
Austria youth international footballers
Austria under-21 international footballers
2. Liga (Austria) players
Austrian Regionalliga players
Austrian Football Bundesliga players
FK Austria Wien players
First Vienna FC players
LASK players
SK Austria Klagenfurt players
SV Grödig players
FC DAC 1904 Dunajská Streda players
Slovak Super Liga players
Bohemians 1905 players
SKN St. Pölten players
SC Wiener Neustadt players
Austrian expatriate footballers
Expatriate footballers in Slovakia
Austrian expatriate sportspeople in Slovakia
Expatriate footballers in the Czech Republic
Austrian expatriate sportspeople in the Czech Republic
Association football goalkeepers